Corvette Evolution GT (known as Evolution GT in Europe) is a racing video game released for PlayStation 2 and Windows in 2006. A version for Nintendo DS was released in 2008.

The Nintendo DS version is similar to its console counterpart, but it does not feature the attributes from them. It was developed by Island Racing Studios. It features only a part of the cars and tracks from the PlayStation 2 and Windows version (12 cars and 8 tracks, opposed to 33 cars and almost 30 tracks) and similar events appear in the game.

Reception

The PC version has a 61 percent score on GameRankings.

GameSpot gave the video game a 6.9 average rating, praising for its deep RPG style driver development, good career mode and excellent AI, while the main critics comes from poor presentation, lack of online multiplayer and lack of extras. Videogamer.com praised the game for the handling models, great variety of tracks, while blaming the poor tutorial. Eurogamer criticized the game for being too boring, and offering an exaggerated simulation of the intimidation.

References

2006 video games
video game
Milestone srl games
Nintendo DS games
PlayStation 2 games
PlayStation Network games
Racing video games
Racing video games set in the United States
Sports video games set in France
Sports video games set in Germany
Sports video games with career mode
Valcon Games games
Video games developed in Italy
Video games set in England
Windows games
Multiplayer and single-player video games
RenderWare games
Black Bean Games games